Samuel Nnaemeka Anyanwu (born 18 June 1965) is a Nigerian politician who represented the Imo East constituency in Imo State in the 8th Assembly Senate of Nigeria. He declared to run for Governor in the 2019 elections but lost to Chukwuemeka Ihedioha. in the party primaries. He is a member of the People's Democratic Party.

Education
Anyanwu received his Bachelor of Science degree from the University of Port Harcourt in 2001.

Career
Anyanwu was chair of the Ikeduru Local Government Area in western Imo State from 2004 to 2007 and was a member of the Imo State House of Assembly from 2007 to 2015. In the Senate he was a member of the committees on Ethics, Privileges and Public Positions and Customs, Exercise, and Tariff.

References

21st-century Nigerian politicians
Peoples Democratic Party (Nigeria) politicians
Peoples Democratic Party members of the Senate (Nigeria)
University of Port Harcourt alumni
Members of the Imo State House of Assembly
1965 births
Living people